The 1981 Monterrey WCT was a men's tennis tournament played on indoor carpet courts in Monterrey, Mexico. The event was part of the WCT Tour which was incorporated into the 1981 Volvo Grand Prix circuit. It was the third edition of the tournament and was held from January 19 through January 25, 1981. Fourth-seeded Johan Kriek won the singles title.

Finals

Singles
 Johan Kriek defeated  Vitas Gerulaitis 7–6, 3–6, 7–6
 It was Kriek's 1st singles title of the year and the 2nd of his career.

Doubles
 Kevin Curren /  Steve Denton defeated  Johan Kriek /  Russell Simpson 7–6, 6–3

References

External links
 ITF tournament edition details

Monterrey
1981 in Mexican tennis
Monterrey WCT